Diego Zarzosa Peña (born 25 December 1975 in Valladolid) is a Spanish rugby union hooker who plays for CR El Salvador in the División de Honor.

Zarzosa represented Spain during the 1999 Rugby World Cup.
In 2007, Zarzosa signed a six-months contract with English giants Harlequins after Samoan Tani Fuga was called to the World Cup squad and Chris Brooker suffered a shoulder injury. He was not able to debut in the Premiership. Later that year, he became the second Spanish-born rugby player to play for the Barbarians.

Zarzosa holds currently 45 caps for Spain, with 3 tries scored, 15 points in aggregate.

External links
Diego Zarzosa International Statistics

1975 births
Living people
Spanish rugby union players
Barbarian F.C. players
Rugby union hookers
Sportspeople from Valladolid
Spain international rugby union players
Spanish expatriate rugby union players
Expatriate rugby union players in England
Spanish expatriate sportspeople in England